Argyrokastro ("silver castle") is a castle in the region of the Peloponnese, Greece. It is located in mountainous Arcadia, near the village of Magouliana, at an elevation of 1,450 m. It is also known as the Gortyniako dynamari ("Gortynian stronghold").

The castle was erected during the Frankish rule by the Villehardouin dynasty of the Principality of Achaea, and served as their summer retreat.

External links
Magouliana homepage 
Magouliana Castle 

Castles and fortifications of the Principality of Achaea
Vytina
13th-century fortifications in Greece